The Newtown–Stephensburg Historic District is located in the central section of Stephens City, Virginia along U.S. Route 11 from the far northern to the far southern boundaries of the town and from just east of Green Hill Cemetery to just west of the interchange of State Route 277 and Interstate 81.

It is a  historic district that includes 143 contributing buildings and 4 additional contributing sites.

History

The area that makes up the Newtown–Stephensburg Historic District was originally settled in 1734 by German settler Peter Stephens.  Stephens travelled from Pennsylvania with Joist Hite in 1732.  Hite's grandson, Issac Hite, Jr. would later build the Belle Grove Plantation in nearby Middletown, Virginia.

Peter Stephens son, Lewis Stephens, was the owner of the original  that made up the town of Stephensburgh, as it was called when chartered and founded in September 1758.

Stephensburgh would become the second oldest town in the Shenandoah Valley (behind nearby Winchester, Virginia).  Since its beginnings, the town would be a commercial hub along the "Great Philadelphia Wagon Road" (what is now today U.S. Route 11) and the "Old Dutch Wagon Road" (what is today State Route 277).  Because Routes 11 and 277 were two very heavily traveled arteries through the 19th and 20th centuries, the town's businesses oriented towards transportation from the nationally known "Newtown Wagon" companies for the 1800s to today numerous service centers and eateries.

The historical integrity of the individual buildings and the general townscape that make up this historic area is impressive; little to no new construction has taken place in this area since the early 1940s.

See also
 National Register of Historic Places in Frederick County, Virginia

References

External links
 

Historic districts on the National Register of Historic Places in Virginia
Stephens City, Virginia
Geography of Frederick County, Virginia
Georgian architecture in Virginia
Tourist attractions in Frederick County, Virginia
National Register of Historic Places in Frederick County, Virginia